Lafayette Building may refer to:

 Lafayette Building (Washington, D.C.)
 Lafayette Building (Detroit)
 John Mark Verdier House, also known as Lafayette Building, in Beaufort, South Carolina